The 1964–65 Cypriot Cup was the 23rd edition of the Cypriot Cup. A total of 12 clubs entered the competition. It began with the first round on 6 June 1965 and concluded on 4 July 1965 with the final which was held at the Old GSP Stadium. Omonia won their 1st Cypriot Cup trophy after beating Apollon 5–1 in the final.

Sources

See also
 Cypriot Cup
 1964–65 Cypriot First Division

Cypriot Cup seasons
1964–65 domestic association football cups
1964–65 in Cypriot football